Hughes County is a county in the U.S. state of South Dakota. As of the 2020 United States Census, the population was 17,765, making it the least populous capital county in the nation, and the twelfth-most populous county in South Dakota. Its county seat is Pierre, which is also the state capital. The county was created in 1873, and was organized in 1880. It was named for Alexander Hughes, a legislator. On 4 June 1891, the county's area was increased by the addition of Farm Island, in the Missouri River downstream of Pierre.

Hughes County is part of the Pierre, SD Micropolitan Statistical Area.

Geography
The Missouri River forms the southwestern boundary line of Hughes County. The county's terrain consists of rolling hills cut by gullies and drainages. The area is partially dedicated to agriculture, including the use of center pivot irrigation.

The county terrain generally slopes to the southeast, although the hills along the west fall off into the river valley. The county's highest point is on the upper part of the east boundary line, at 1,952' (595m) ASL.

Major highways

 U.S. Highway 14
 U.S. Highway 83
 South Dakota Highway 34
 South Dakota Highway 1804

Airport
Pierre Regional Airport (PIR) serves Hughes County and the surrounding communities.

Adjacent counties

 Sully County - north
 Hyde County - east
 Lyman County - south
 Stanley County - west

Protected areas

 Arikara State Game Production Area
 Buckeye State Game Production Area
 Cowan State Game Production Area
 DeGrey State Game Production Area
 DeGrey State Lakeside Use Area
 Dry Run State Game Production Area
 East Shore State Lakeside Use Area
 Farm Island State Recreation Area
 Fort George State Game Production Area
 Fort George State Lakeside Use Area
 Gutenkauf State Game Production Area
 Joe Creek Recreation Area
 LaFramboise Island State Nature Area
 North Bend State Lakeside Use Area
 North Big Bend State Game Production Area
 Oahe Mission Recreation Area
 Peoria Flats State Game Production Area
 Peoria Flats State Lakeside Use Area
 Rousseau State Game Production Area
 Rousseau State Lakeside Use Area
 Sand Creek State Game Production Area
 Spring Creek State Recreation Area
 Tailrace Recreation Area
 Valley state Game Production Area
 West Bend State Recreation Area
 West Big Bend State Game Production Area
 West DeGrey State Game Production Area
 Woodruff Lake State Game Production Area

Lakes
 Lake Oahe (part)
 Lake Sharpe (part)
 Woodruff Lake

Demographics

2000 census
As of the 2000 United States Census, there were 16,481 people, 6,512 households, and 4,310 families in the county. The population density was 22 people per square mile (9/km2). There were 7,055 housing units at an average density of 10 per square mile (4/km2). The racial makeup of the county was 88.91% White, 0.19% Black or African American, 8.70% Native American, 0.40% Asian, 0.02% Pacific Islander, 0.31% from other races, and 1.47% from two or more races. 1.22% of the population were Hispanic or Latino of any race.

There were 6,512 households, out of which 33.80% had children under the age of 18 living with them, 54.00% were married couples living together, 8.90% had a female householder with no husband present, and 33.80% were non-families. 29.80% of all households were made up of individuals, and 10.30% had someone living alone who was 65 years of age or older. The average household size was 2.41 and the average family size was 3.00.

The county population contained 27.80% under the age of 18, 6.20% from 18 to 24, 28.60% from 25 to 44, 23.70% from 45 to 64, and 13.70% who were 65 years of age or older. The median age was 38 years. For every 100 females, there were 92.60 males. For every 100 females age 18 and over, there were 88.70 males.

The median income for a household in the county was $42,970, and the median income for a family was $51,235. Males had a median income of $32,228 versus $22,656 for females. The per capita income for the county was $20,689. About 6.00% of families and 8.00% of the population were below the poverty line, including 7.80% of those under age 18 and 10.90% of those age 65 or over.

2010 census
As of the 2010 United States Census, there were 17,022 people, 7,066 households, and 4,435 families in the county. The racial makeup of the county was 85.7% white, 10.5% American Indian, 0.5% black or African American, 0.5% Asian, 0.5% from other races, and 2.3% from two or more races. Those of Hispanic or Latino origin made up 1.8% of the population. In terms of ancestry, 42.7% were German, 12.4% were Norwegian, 9.8% were Irish, 9.7% were English, and 3.8% were American.

Of the 7,066 households, 30.2% had children under the age of 18 living with them, 49.5% were married couples living together, 9.4% had a female householder with no husband present, 37.2% were non-families, and 32.3% of all households were made up of individuals. The average household size was 2.30 and the average family size was 2.90. The median age was 39.8 years.

The median income for a household in the county was $53,501 and the median income for a family was $70,881. Males had a median income of $42,701 versus $32,265 for females. The per capita income for the county was $28,236. About 7.1% of families and 9.3% of the population were below the poverty line, including 14.5% of those under age 18 and 6.0% of those age 65 or over.

Politics
Hughes is a strongly Republican county in Presidential and Congressional elections. The last Democrat to win a majority in the county was Franklin D. Roosevelt in 1936. In 2012, Republican Mitt Romney won 64% of the county's vote.

In the South Dakota Senate Hughes is part of the 24th Senate district, which is held by Republican Bob Gray. In the State House Hughes is part of district 24, which is held by Republicans Tad Perry and Mark Venner.

Communities

Cities
 Blunt
 Pierre (county seat)

Town
 Harrold

Census-designated place 

 Oahe Acres

Unincorporated communities
 Canning

Townships
 Raber
 Valley

Unorganized territories
 Crow Creek
 North Hughes
 West Hughes

See also
 National Register of Historic Places listings in Hughes County, South Dakota

References

 
Pierre, South Dakota micropolitan area
South Dakota counties on the Missouri River
1880 establishments in Dakota Territory
Populated places established in 1880